Acanthohoplitinae is an extinct subfamily of cephalopods belonging to the ammonite family Parahoplitidae.

References

Ancyloceratina